The 82nd Assembly District of Wisconsin is one of 99 districts in the Wisconsin State Assembly.  Located in southeast Wisconsin, the district comprises parts of southwest Milwaukee County and southeast Waukesha County.  It includes most of the city of Franklin, the southern half of the city of Muskego, and much of the village of Greendale.  The district is represented by Republican Ken Skowronski, since January 2014.

The 82nd Assembly District is located within Wisconsin's 28th Senate district, along with the 83rd and 84th Assembly districts.

List of past representatives

References 

Wisconsin State Assembly districts
Milwaukee County, Wisconsin
Waukesha County, Wisconsin